Muskowekwan 85-23 is an Indian reserve of the Muskowekwan First Nation in Saskatchewan. It is 22 kilometres southwest of Lestock, and adjacent to the southern boundary of Muskowekwan 85. In the 2016 Canadian Census, it recorded a population of 0 living in 0 of its 0 total private dwellings.

References

Indian reserves in Saskatchewan
Division No. 10, Saskatchewan